Priscilla Meirelles de Almeida (born 5 September 1983) is a Brazilian model, host, actress, environmentalist and beauty queen. She won the Miss Earth 2004 pageant held in the Philippines. She also won the Miss Globe 2003 pageant. Meirelles has been married to Filipino actor and model John Estrada since March 2011.

Early life
Meirelles born in the city of Belém do Pará, a city of the Brazilian Amazon region, represented the Brazilian state of Amazonas 
in beauty contests by the Brazil, she was chosen Miss Earth Brazil also representing the Amazonas state in 2004. Her father Luis Claudio Almeida is an advertising company creative director and her mother, Marcia Regina Meirelles is a businesswoman. She is of Portuguese and Spanish descent.

Beauty pageant
In 2003, Meirelles represented the State of Amazonas in Miss Globe Brazil held on 15 March that year in Brasília, and was elected, then won the 2003 Miss Globe pageant in Antalya, Turkey on 25 July the same year. On 28 July 2004 she won the Beleza Brazil pageant, held in Belo Horizonte and on 24 October 2004 she became the first Brazilian to be crowned Miss Earth, held in Quezon City (Philippines). She also won the Most Photogenic Award. In winning Miss Earth, Brazil became the first country to win the "Big Four" in beauty pageants

Meirelles co-hosted the Miss Earth pageant coronation night for three succeeding years in the Philippines. She first co-hosted the Miss Earth 2006 won by Hil Hernández of Chile that took place in the grounds of the National Museum in Manila followed by the Miss Earth 2007 pageant won by Jessica Trisko of Canada held at the University of the Philippines Theater in Quezon City, and lastly the Miss Earth 2008 pageant that took place at the Clark Expo Amphitheater in Angeles, Pampanga where the Philippines' bet Karla Henry won the coveted crown. She was also the chairwoman of the Miss Earth 2009 panel of judges.

Personal life
Filipino actor, host, and model John Estrada proposed to marry Mereilles on 15 July 2009 at Elbert's Steak House in Makati. They were married on 26 February 2011 in La Union province, Philippines. The couple announced her pregnancy in July 2011 and had a baby shower of their first child on 22 January 2012 held at The Peninsula Manila. She gave birth to a daughter, Sammanta Anechka, on 6 February 2012.

Woman of the Year 
On 25 November 2019, Meirelles was one of the recipients of The Outstanding Men and Women of the Year Philippines  for her outstanding achievements and contributions to society and the country, as well as her active pursuit of her environmental advocacies. The event was held at the Teatrino Promenade in Greenhills, San Juan, Metro Manila.

Filmography

Television
Be My Lady (2016) - Chelsea Oliviera
Wildflower (2017) - Prianka Aguas
Haplos (2017) - Madam Sally
Bagong Umaga (2020-2021) - Olivia

References

External links
 Priscilla Meirelles Instagram Profile
 Priscilla Meirelles Star Magic ABS-CBN
 Priscilla Meirelles Official Site

1983 births
Living people
Brazilian expatriates in the Philippines
Brazilian female models
Miss Earth winners
Miss Globe International winners
Brazilian people of Portuguese descent
Brazilian people of Spanish descent
Brazilian beauty pageant winners
Star Magic
Miss Earth 2004 contestants
Brazilian television actresses
People from Manaus